Marion Evelyn Colthorpe  (1933/4 – 20 January 2021) was a British historian and Elizabethan scholar.

Biography
Colthorpe studied English at St Hugh's College, Oxford and subsequently trained as a barrister, being called to the Bar at Lincoln's Inn. She spent a great deal of time researching her life's work 'The Elizabethan Court Day by Day', published online by the Folger Institute.

She was elected as a Fellow of the Society of Antiquaries of London on 10 October 2018.

Select publications
 Colthorpe, M. E. 2017. The Elizabethan Court Day by Day, Folger.
 Colthorpe, M. 1989. "Queen Elizabeth I and Norwich Cathedral", Norfolk Archaeology 40(3). 
 Colthorpe, M. 1987. "The Theobalds entertainment for Queen Elizabeth I in 1591, with a transcript of the Gardener's Speech", Records of Early English Drama 12(1), pp. 2–9.
 Colthorpe, M. 1986. "A 'prorogued' Elizabethan tournament", Records of Early English Drama 11(2), pp. 3–9.
 Colthorpe, M.  1984. "Edmund Campion’s Alleged Interview with Queen Elizabeth I in 1581", British Catholic History 17(2), pp. 197–200. 
 Colthorpe, M. and Bateman, L. 1977. Queen Elizabeth I and Harlow.

References

1930s births
Year of birth uncertain
2021 deaths
Alumni of St Hugh's College, Oxford
Fellows of the Society of Antiquaries of London
British women historians
20th-century British historians